The 42nd Massachusetts General Court, consisting of the Massachusetts Senate and the Massachusetts House of Representatives, met in 1821 and 1822 during the governorship of John Brooks. John Phillips served as president of the Senate.  Josiah Quincy III and Luther Lawrence served as speakers of the House.

Senators

Representatives

See also
 17th United States Congress
 List of Massachusetts General Courts

References

External links
 . (Includes data for state senate and house elections in 1821)
 
 

Political history of Massachusetts
Massachusetts legislative sessions
massachusetts
1821 in Massachusetts
massachusetts
1822 in Massachusetts